South Mills is an unincorporated community and census-designated place (CDP) in Camden County, North Carolina, United States. Its population was 454 as of the 2010 census. South Mills has a post office with ZIP code 27976, which opened on March 2, 1840. The community is located near U.S. Route 17, and U.S. Route 17 Business and North Carolina Highway 343 pass through the community.

The community derived its name from a watermill which operated near the original town site.

The William Riley Abbott House, Dismal Swamp Canal, and Morgan House are listed on the National Register of Historic Places.

Demographics

2020 census

As of the 2020 United States census, there were 362 people, 181 households, and 139 families residing in the CDP.

References

Census-designated places in North Carolina
Census-designated places in Camden County, North Carolina
Unincorporated communities in North Carolina
Unincorporated communities in Camden County, North Carolina